4953 Pitchford Hall is a 4-6-0  Hall class steam locomotive built by the Great Western Railway (GWR), currently preserved at the Epping Ongar Railway.

Operation
Built at Swindon Works in August 1929 for a cost of £4375, the locomotive worked from a wide variety of sheds all over the GWR network, until withdrawal by British Railways in May 1963. It covered 1,344,464 miles over that period. Acquired by Woodham Brothers scrapyard in Barry, Vale of Glamorgan, South Wales in October 1963, it was purchased by Dr John Kennedy in 1984.

Preservation
Moved to Tyseley Locomotive Works, it was restored to full mainline standard, and moved under its own power once again in February 2004. It made its first public appearance in 42 years at the Crewe Great Gathering in September 2005.

In February 2007 the locomotive attended the Keighley and Worth Valley Railway's Winter Steam Gala, and on 19 May 2007 performed in tandem with 4965 Rood Ashton Hall on a trip to Bristol from their Tyseley base.

After the 2010 Tyseley Locomotive Works steam, the locomotive was moved to the Great Central Railway.

In 2011, after working the GCR Winter Steam Gala, it visited the Mid Hants Railway, before returning to the GCR. It was sold in late 2011 by Dr John Kennedy to the Epping Ongar Railway, though it remained at the GCR until April 2012, when it was moved to the EOR in time for the line's opening in late May 2012. The loco remained in service there until summer 2013 when it was withdrawn for the routine 10-year overhaul which was completed in December 2019. The locomotive is currently wearing British Railways lined black livery.

References

4953
Railway locomotives introduced in 1929
4953
Locomotives saved from Woodham Brothers scrapyard
Standard gauge steam locomotives of Great Britain
4-6-0 locomotives